The Michael and Margaritha Beck Farmstead is located in Jefferson, Wisconsin.

History
German immigrants Michael and Margaritha Beck (also known as Bieck) established the farm in 1865. It originally specialized in wheat before transitioning to dairy. Structures on the site include a farmhouse, bank barn, milk-house, granary, machine shed and an outhouse. The farmstead was added to the State Register of Historic Places in 2017 and to the National Register of Historic Places in 2018.

References

Farms on the National Register of Historic Places in Wisconsin
National Register of Historic Places in Jefferson County, Wisconsin
Dairy buildings in the United States
Late 19th and Early 20th Century American Movements architecture